Kristýna Bláhová (born 10 February 2000) is a Czech ice hockey player for HC Příbram and the Czech national team.

She participated at the 2017 IIHF Women's World Championship.

References

External links
 
 

2000 births
Living people
Ball hockey players
Czech women's ice hockey goaltenders
Ice hockey players at the 2016 Winter Youth Olympics
Universiade medalists in ice hockey
Medalists at the 2023 Winter World University Games
Universiade bronze medalists for the Czech Republic